Natividad "Naty" Crame-Rogers (23 December 1922 – 1 February 2021) was a Filipina actress, drama teacher, writer, producer and researcher. She was best known for her role in the 1965 film adaptation of the play A Portrait of the Artist as Filipino.

Crame-Rogers was born in Cavite and studied at St. Scholastica’s College and University of the Philippines. She later went to the United States, where she completed a Teaching English as a Second Language Program at the University of California, Los Angeles.

She formed the Philippine Drama Company and Amingtahanan Sala Theater. She died on 1 February 2021, at age 98.

References

External links

1922 births
2021 deaths
Filipino film actresses
Filipino stage actresses
University of California, Los Angeles alumni
St. Scholastica's College Manila alumni
University of the Philippines alumni
20th-century Filipino actresses
Actresses from Cavite